The Weightroom is a studio album by American hip hop musician Blueprint. It was released on Weightless Recordings in 2003.

Track listing

References

External links
 

2003 albums
Blueprint (rapper) albums